Aleksanteri (Ale) Holopainen (24 April 1908, Korpiselkä - 23 June 1974) was a Finnish farmer and politician. He was a member of the Parliament of Finland from 1957 to 1970, representing the Agrarian League (which changed its name to Centre Party in 1965).

References

1908 births
1974 deaths
People from Suoyarvsky District
People from Viipuri Province (Grand Duchy of Finland)
Centre Party (Finland) politicians
Members of the Parliament of Finland (1954–58)
Members of the Parliament of Finland (1958–62)
Members of the Parliament of Finland (1962–66)
Members of the Parliament of Finland (1966–70)